Cooper High School may refer to:

Cooper High School (Abilene, Texas)
Cooper High School (Cooper, Texas)
Cooper City High School, Florida
Randall K. Cooper High School, Union, Kentucky
Robbinsdale Cooper High School, New Hope, Minnesota

See also

Cooper School (disambiguation)
Lubbock-Cooper Independent School District, Texas